Robert Charles Appleyard (born 9 December 1972) is a former Wales international rugby union player. A flanker, he played club rugby for Swansea RFC Sale Sharks and Cardiff RFC. He was assistant coach to the Wales national under-20 rugby union team for the 2008 and 2010 Junior Rugby World Cup. He is currently a director/agent at Win sports management.

In June 2011 he was appointed full-time defence coach to Newport Gwent Dragons He started his coaching career as defence coach at the Ospreys before moving west as a skills coach at the Scarlets.

References

1972 births
Living people
Barbarian F.C. players
Cardiff RFC players
Rugby union players from Haverfordwest
Sale Sharks players
Swansea RFC players
Wales international rugby union players
Welsh rugby union coaches
Welsh rugby union players